Hymn of the Seventh Galaxy is the third studio album by American jazz fusion band Return to Forever. It was released in October 1973 by Polydor. Flora Purim, Joe Farrell, and Airto Moreira were replaced by drummer Lenny White and guitarist Bill Connors. But it would be the only album with Bill Connors as guitarist, he left after its release and was replaced by Al Di Meola.

Music 
Drawing on rock and funk, the album emphasized electric instruments more than Return to Forever's previous albums. Clarke contributed one song for the album while Corea wrote the rest of the material. Corea relied mostly on electric piano and organ.

Critical reception 
Daniel Gioffre for Allmusic wrote, "it is the quality of the compositions that marks Hymn of the Seventh Galaxy as an indispensable disc of '70s fusion".

Track listing

Personnel 
 Chick Corea – acoustic piano, Fender Rhodes electric piano, harpsichord, Yamaha electric organ, gongs
 Bill Connors – electric guitar, acoustic guitar
 Stanley Clarke – electric bass, bell tree
 Lenny White – drums, percussion, congas, bongos

Chart performance

References

External links 
 Return to Forever - Hymn of the Seventh Galaxy (1973) album review by Daniel Gioffre, credits & releases at AllMusic
 Return to Forever - Hymn of the Seventh Galaxy (1973) album releases & credits at Discogs
 Return to Forever - Hymn of the Seventh Galaxy (1973) album credits & user reviews at ProgArchives.com
 Return to Forever - Hymn of the Seventh Galaxy (1973, Remastered 1991) album to be listened as stream on Spotify

1973 albums
Albums recorded at Record Plant (New York City)
Polydor Records albums
Return to Forever albums
Instrumental albums